Hubert Locco is a Paralympian athlete from France competing mainly in category T54 sprint events.

Hubert has competed in the 100m and 200m in the 1996 and 2004 Summer Paralympics, but it was when he teamed up with the French T53-54 4 × 100 m relay team in Athens that he won his only medal, a bronze.

External links
 

Paralympic athletes of France
Athletes (track and field) at the 1996 Summer Paralympics
Athletes (track and field) at the 2004 Summer Paralympics
Paralympic bronze medalists for France
French male wheelchair racers
Living people
Year of birth missing (living people)
Medalists at the 2004 Summer Paralympics
Paralympic medalists in athletics (track and field)
20th-century French people
21st-century French people